Lyndal Anne Roper  (born 1956) is a historian. She was born in Melbourne, Australia.  She works on German history of the sixteenth to eighteenth centuries, and has written a biography of Martin Luther. Her research centres on gender and the Reformation, witchcraft, and visual culture. In 2011 she was appointed to Regius Chair of History at the University of Oxford, the first woman and first Australian to hold this position.

Biography
Roper graduated from the University of Melbourne in history and philosophy in 1977 after which she received the first Caltex Woman Graduate of the Year scholarship and an additional scholarship from the University Women Graduates’ association. An award from the German Academic Exchange Service (DAAD) allowed her to undertake study in Germany. During her initial nearly two years in Germany, Roper studied with Heiko Oberman at the University of Tübingen, and worked with Ingrid Batori and Hans-Christoph Rublack. She then moved to King’s College London where in 1985 she completed her PhD, supervised by Robert W. Scribner.

Before completing her doctorate, Roper began a Junior Research Fellowship at Merton College at the University of Oxford (1983–6). In 1986 she took up a non-permanent Lectureship at King’s College London, and moved in 1987 to a permanent post at Royal Holloway, University of London, becoming Professor in 1999 and establishing (with Amanda Vickery) the first Master’s programme in Women’s and Gender History. She has been Fellow of the Wissenschaftskolleg zu Berlin (1991–2) and has held Visiting positions at the Eisenberg Centre, Ann Arbor, the University of Western Australia, the Australian National University, Canberra, the Freie Universität Berlin, and the Max Planck Institut, Göttingen. In 2002 she took up a Lectureship and Fellowship at Balliol College, Oxford. She is currently Regius Professor of History at the University of Oxford and a Fellow of Oriel College. She is an Honorary Fellow of Merton College, Oxford, and of Balliol College, Oxford.

Books

Living I Was Your Plague: Martin Luther's World and Legacy
In Living I Was Your Plague, Roper explores some of the more controversial aspects of Martin Luther's personality - his use of vulgar language, his pugilism, and his rampant anti-Semitism. The work also analyses the images of Luther created by the artist Lucas Cranach that have become so instantly recognisable, showing how Luther carefully created the image of himself that he wanted to present to the world. Roper ends by assessing Luther's legacy in more recent years, in particular how he was presented in the former East Germany and how he was celebrated during the 2017 quincentenary year of the 95 Theses.

Martin Luther: Renegade and Prophet
Roper’s Martin Luther: Renegade and Prophet, has been translated into German, Spanish, Polish, Portuguese, Czech and Dutch; in Germany it became a best-seller. Published to coincide with the 500th anniversary of the posting of the 95 Theses and the start of the Reformation, Roper’s biography is one of the first to locate Luther within his social and cultural context, foregrounding his physicality and thus seeking to understand his theology in new ways. The work was shortlisted for both the Wolfson History Prize and the Elizabeth Longford Prize.

The Witch in the Western Imagination
Exploring how witches and witchcraft have been portrayed through art and literature, The Witch in the Western Imagination builds on Roper’s previous works to explain why witches are so often represented as old hags. Yet the figure of the witch is not always portrayed in a negative light, and she might be an individual who could stand up to authority and even represent the community itself. By delving into the importance of ‘fantasy’ to the interpretation of witches and witchcraft, Roper’s nuanced study interprets ‘how individuals made sense of witchcraft, why the figure of the witch could arouse such intense emotion, and why she could be used in so many ways.’

Witch Craze: Terror and Fantasy in Baroque Germany
Witch Craze explores the role of unconscious fantasy in history by taking four case studies of witch hunting in southern Germany, the region with the highest number of executions of people accused as witches. Using extensive archival sources, including original trial transcripts, the book studies the psychology of witch-hunting, arguing that what powered these witch-hunts were fears surrounding fertility. Roper examines ‘why it was mostly older women that were the victims of witch crazes, why they confessed to crimes, and how the depiction of witches in art and literature has influenced the characterization of elderly women in our own culture.’  The book has been translated into German with Beck (Hexenwahn: Geschichte einer Verfolgung)  and was awarded the Roland H Bainton Prize in 2005.

Oedipus and the Devil: Witchcraft, Religion and Sexuality in Early Modern Europe
A collection of nine interconnected essays, Oedipus and the Devil explores subjects ranging from the literary culture of the sixteenth century, to early-modern sexual attitudes and ideas regarding femininity and masculinity, to issues surrounding the complex development of marriage, and the use of psychoanalysis in studying witchcraft.  Roper examines why a woman would kill her child, why someone would confess to living with the devil like husband and wife, and why a famous banker might employ a village clairvoyant (‘Dorf hellseherin’). The work has been translated into German with Fischer Taschenbuch (Ödipus und der Teufel: Körper und Psyche in der Frühen Neuzeit) and is widely cited.

The Holy Household: Women and Morals in Reformation Augsburg
Roper’s first book questioned the ways in which the Reformation changed gender relations, focussing on the case study of Augsburg, one of the most important cities of the Holy Roman Empire. Exploring the idea of ‘civic righteousness,’ Roper argued that the Reformation developed a theology of gender whereby the roles of men and women were clearly distinct within the vision of the ‘holy household.’ Whilst previously the effect of the Reformation on women was regarded as beneficial, this book argues that the status of women was instead worsened.  The book has been translated into German and has been reprinted several times.

Currently Roper is writing a history of the German Peasants' War (1524–5).

Awards and honors
In 2016, Roper won the Gerda Henkel Prize for lifetime achievement in history. Currently she holds a Humboldt Research Award (associated with the Free University Berlin) for research in Germany. She is Honorary Fellow of the History Department, University of Melbourne, Fellow of the Australian Academy of the Humanities (2009), Fellow of the British Academy (2011), and Fellow of the Berlin-Brandenburgische Akademie der Wissenschaften, Berlin (2016). She also holds a Honorary Doctorates from the University of Melbourne (2013) and the University of Basel (2021).

2021-3, Leverhulme Senior Research Fellowship
2021, Honorary Doctorate in Theology, University of Basel
2021, Lisa Jardine Lecture, Jesus College, Cambridge
2020, The Natalie Zemon Davis Lectures, Central European University
2019, Humboldt Prize
2017, Laurence Stone Lectures, Princeton University
2016, Mitglied Brandenburgische Akademie der Wissenschaften
2016, Gerda Henkel Preis 
2015, Wiles Lectures, Queen’s University of Belfast
2015-8, Chair of Section H9, British Academy
2013, Honorary Doctorate, University of Melbourne
2011, Fellow, British Academy
2010, Honorary Professorial Fellow, University of Melbourne
2009, Fellow, Australian Academy of the Humanities
2005, Roland Bainton Prize for Witch Craze
2000–12, Joint Editor, Past & Present
Honorary Fellow, Merton College, Oxford; Balliol College, Oxford

Selected works
Living I Was Your Plague: Martin Luther's World and Legacy (Princeton University Press, 2021).
Martin Luther: Renegade and Prophet (The Bodley Head, 2016)
 The Witch in the Western Imagination (University of Virginia Press, 2012). xi+240pp. review
"Witchcraft and the Western Imagination," Transactions of the Royal Historical Society, Vol. 16 (December 2006), pp. 117–41. Claims that demonology could form part of a literature of entertainment. review in Jstor
Witch Craze: Terror and Fantasy in Baroque Germany (Yale University Press, 2004), . 362pp.
 Dreams and History: The Interpretation of Dreams from Ancient Greece to Modern Psychoanalysis (ed. with Daniel Pick)  (East Sussex: Brunner-Routledge, 2004) 276pp.
 Religion and Culture in Germany (1400–1800) (Posthumously collected essays of Robert W. Scribner) (Leiden: Brill, 2001). review
"Evil imaginings and fantasies: Child-witches and the end of the witch-craze," Past and Present, Vol. 167 (May 2000), pp. 107–39
"Witchcraft and fantasy in early modern Germany" (Witchcraft in Early Modern Europe: Studies in Culture and Belief) (Past & Present Publications) (Cambridge, 1996), ed. by Jonathan Barry, Marianne Hester, and Gareth Roberts.
Oedipus and the Devil: Witchcraft, Sexuality and Religion in Early Modern Europe (Routledge, 1994)
The Holy Household: Women and Morals in Reformation Augsburg. (Clarendon Press, 1989, 1991). Claims that the Reformation significantly worsened the situation of European women. review in History Today review in Jstor
Disciplines of Faith: Studies in Religion, Politics, and Patriarchy (with Jim Obelkevich and Raphael Samuel) (Routledge and Kegan Paul, 1987)

References

External links
Lyndal Roper, History Faculty Website
Lyndal Roper, Balliol College Website
Review by Katryn Hughes
Luther: Sex, Marriage and Motherhood by Lyndal Roper
Discussion with Melvin Bragg as panelist on In Our Time – Witchcraft

1956 births
Living people
Academics from Melbourne
Alumni of King's College London
Australian women historians
Fellows of Balliol College, Oxford
Fellows of Merton College, Oxford
Fellows of Oriel College, Oxford
Fellows of the British Academy
Fellows of the Royal Historical Society
Historians of witchcraft
Regius Professors of History (University of Oxford)
University of Melbourne alumni
University of Tübingen alumni
21st-century Australian non-fiction writers
21st-century Australian women writers
Historians of Protestantism
Reformation historians